Louis Pinton (24 October 1948 – 17 November 2016) was a member of the Senate of France, representing the Indre department.  He was a member of the Union for a Popular Movement.

References

External links
Page on the Senate website

1948 births
2016 deaths
French Senators of the Fifth Republic
Union for a Popular Movement politicians
Senators of Indre